The 9th annual Venice International Film Festival was held from 19 August to 4 September 1948.

Jury 
 Luigi Chiarini 
 Mario Gromo  
 Guido Aristarco  
 Alberto Consiglio  
 Arturo Lanocita  
 Vinicio Marinucci  
 Mario Melloni  
 Giorgio Prosperi  
 Andrew Félix Morlión

In Competition

Awards
Grand International Prize of Venice
 Best Film -  Hamlet (Laurence Olivier)
Best Italian Film 
Sotto il sole di Roma (Renato Castellani) 
Silver Lion for Best Direction
 Georg Wilhelm Pabst (Der Prozeß)
Volpi Cup
Best Actor - Ernst Deutsch (Der Prozeß) 
Best Actress - Jean Simmons (Hamlet)
Golden Osella
Best Original Screenplay - Graham Greene (The Fallen Idol) 
Best Cinematography - Desmond Dickinson (Hamlet)
Best Original Music - Max Steiner (The Treasure of the Sierra Madre)
Outstanding Technical Contribution - John Bryan (Oliver Twist)
International Award
Louisiana Story (Robert J. Flaherty)
The Fugitive (John Ford)
La Terra Trema (Luchino Visconti)
ANICA Cup
Sotto il sole di Roma (Renato Castellani) 
Cinecittà Cup
Duel in the Sun (David O. Selznick)
ENIC Cup
Anni difficili (Luigi Zampa)

References

External links
 
Venice Film Festival 1948 Awards on IMDb

Venice International Film Festival
Venice International Film Festival
Venice Film Festival
Film
Venice International Film Festival
Venice International Film Festival